In enzymology, a dehydrogluconate dehydrogenase is an enzyme that catalyzes the chemical reaction

2-dehydro-D-gluconate + acceptor  2,5-didehydro-D-gluconate + reduced acceptor

Thus, the two substrates of this enzyme are 2-dehydro-D-gluconate and acceptor, whereas its two products are 2,5-didehydro-D-gluconate and reduced acceptor.

This enzyme belongs to the family of oxidoreductases, specifically those acting on the CH-OH group of donor with other acceptors. The systematic name of this enzyme class is 2-dehydro-D-gluconate:acceptor 2-oxidoreductase. Other names in common use include ketogluconate dehydrogenase, alpha-ketogluconate dehydrogenase, 2-keto-D-gluconate dehydrogenase, and 2-oxogluconate dehydrogenase. It has 2 cofactors: FAD, and Flavoprotein.

References

 
 

EC 1.1.99
Flavoproteins
Enzymes of unknown structure